The name Tembin has been used for four tropical cyclones in the western Pacific Ocean. The name, contributed by Japan, is the Japanese name for the constellation Libra. 

 Tropical Storm Tembin (2000) (T0005, 09W) – not a threat to land while tropical.
 Tropical Storm Tembin (2005) (T0522, 23W, Ondoy) – crossed the Philippines.
 Typhoon Tembin (2012) (T1214, 15W, Igme)
 Typhoon Tembin (2017) (T1727, 33W, Vinta) – devastated southern Philippines killing over 266 people.

The name Tembin was retired by the WMO in 2018, and replaced with Koinu in 2019, which means puppy or the constellation Canis Minor in Japanese.

Pacific typhoon set index articles